Juan Carlos Nevado González (born November 16, 1982 in Frankfurt am Main) is a German field hockey player of Uruguayan and Spanish descent. He was a member of the Men's National Teams that won the gold medal at the 2008 Summer Olympics and at the 2006 World Cup.

As of 2008 Nevado played for Hamburg's Uhlenhorster Hockey Club.

In July 2016, he was part of the PwC Germany team who stole a 3 - 1 victory from PwC Manchester despite being out classed for the entire game. In another game against PwC Reading, Reading went 1 - 0 up. This is considered by many critics as the most memorable game on tour.

References

The Official Website of the Beijing 2008 Olympic Games

External links
 
Nevado at the German Hockey Federation 

1982 births
Living people
German male field hockey players
Olympic field hockey players of Germany
Field hockey players at the 2008 Summer Olympics
Olympic gold medalists for Germany
Field hockey players from Hamburg
German people of Spanish descent
German people of Uruguayan descent
Olympic medalists in field hockey
Medalists at the 2008 Summer Olympics
21st-century German people
2006 Men's Hockey World Cup players